Lucas Krupinski (born June 5, 1992 in Warsaw, Poland) - Polish pianist, winner of the 7th San Marino International Piano Competition, semi-finalist of the XVII International Chopin Piano Competition in Warsaw in 2015.

His debut album "Espressione" was released in 2017 and includes compositions by Haydn, Chopin and Scriabin. The CD was nominated for the International Classical Music Awards 2018.

Biography 

He previously studied at the Zenon Brzewski School of Music in Warsaw with Professor Joanna Ławrynowicz, at the Fryderyk Chopin University of Music in Warsaw, where he graduated with a “Magna cum laude” distinction under the supervision of Professor Alicja Paleta-Bugaj and Dr Konrad Skolarski. He continued his studies with Professor Arie Vardi at Hannover University of Music, Drama and Media (2017-2018) and with Professor Dmitri Alexeev at the Royal College of Music in London (2018-2019).

A finalist at the Ferruccio Busoni International Piano Competition in Bolzano, winner of first prizes at international piano competitions in Hannover (Chopin Geselschaft - 2015), Aachen (ClaviCologne - 2016) and Goerlitz (MeetingPoint Music Messiaen - 2020). As a semi-finalist, he ranked among the best twenty pianists at the 17th Frederic Chopin International Piano Competition in Warsaw (2015). 

He gave his debut recital at Carnegie Hall / Isaac Stern Auditorium in 2018 and has since received invitations to play with the Chicago Philharmonic and the Buffalo Philharmonic. In the same season, he went on tour with the Santander Orchestra and the legendary Lawrence Foster. During the Winter Olympics in South Korea, Krupiński performed at a special recital in PyeongChang. He has recently performed at the Wigmore Hall in London (2021), Teatro La Fenice in Venice, La Verdi in Milano, Royal Albert Hall in London and Merkin Hall in New York, and has performed recitals in Paris, Beijing, Tokyo and Sydney.

In addition to being twice laureate of the Minister of Culture and National Heritage Prize for remarkable artistic accomplishments, Lucas has also received the Minister of Culture and National Heritage Scholarship and the Krystian Zimerman Foundation Scholarship. In 2016, he was honoured with a Commemorative Medal from the Frederic Chopin University of Music in recognition of his artistic achievements. 

Lucas Krupinski is a Steinway Artist, represented by Ludwig van Beethoven Association and Madam Elzbieta Penderecki.

Awards and competitions 
 Grand Prix and two special prizes at the 2nd Siberian International Chopin Piano Competition in Tomsk (Russia) (2013)
 Polish Minister of Culture and National Heritage Prize for remarkable artistic accomplishments, 2013 & 2014
 I Prize at the Music Foundation of Europe Scholarship Piano Competition, 2014 
 II Prize at the 47th Polish Chopin Competitions in Warsaw, 2015
 I Prize at the 15th Chopin-Gesellschaft International Piano Competitions in Hannover, 2015
 I Prize at the ClaviCologne International Piano Competition 2016 in Aachen
 I prize at the International Piano Competition in San Marino, 2016. In addition to the main prize, he received all the additional prices: the Audience Award, the Music Critics’ Award and the Orchestra Award.
 III prize at the Kissinger Klavierolymp (Kissingen Piano Olympics) 2018
 Main Prize at the Messiaen Music MeetingPoint Competition in Goerlitz, 2020

References

External links 
 Official Website 
 Steinway Artist Profile 
 Spotify Album "Espressione" 
 F. Chopin International Piano Competition in Warsaw, 2015 
 First Prize at the International San Marino Piano Competition

Polish classical pianists
Male classical pianists
1992 births
Living people
21st-century classical pianists
21st-century male musicians